Jonathan Eugene Van Every (born November 27, 1979) is a former Major League Baseball (MLB) outfielder.

Amateur career 
Van Every attended Itawamba Community College in Fulton, Mississippi where he played college baseball. At Itawamba CC, Van Every had a career batting average of .375 with 16 home runs over two seasons.

Professional playing career

Cleveland Indians 
Van Every was drafted by the Cleveland Indians in the 29th round (876th overall) of the 2000 Major League Baseball Draft. He did not play in 2000 because he did not sign until May 19, .

That year, he hit .276 with 21 home runs. In , he was an Eastern League All-Star.

Following the 2007 season, Van Every became a minor league free agent.

Boston Red Sox (first stint) 
On December 1, 2007, the Boston Red Sox signed him to a minor league contract.

Van Every made his major league debut on May 14, against the Baltimore Orioles, starting in center field. In his second career at-bat, he singled to center in the fifth inning off Daniel Cabrera for his first major league hit. Van Every hit his first career home run on April 29, 2009 at Progressive Field against the Cleveland Indians. The solo shot during the top of the 10th inning turned out to be the winning hit as the Red Sox went on to win the game 6–5.

The following day on April 30, 2009, Van Every pitched the final 2/3 of the eighth inning in a 13–0 loss to the Tampa Bay Rays.

On July 8, 2009, Van Every was designated for assignment by the Red Sox to make room on the 40-man roster for Jed Lowrie, who was activated off the 60-day DL. On July 18, 2009, he was released by the Red Sox, after the 10-days of his waiver period ran up.

Pittsburg Pirates (first stint) 
On July 29, 2009, Van Every was signed by the Pittsburgh Pirates as a minor league free agent, and he was assigned to Triple-A Indianapolis. Knee surgery prevented Van Every from appearing with the Pirates organization.

Boston Red Sox (second stint) 
On April 24, 2010, Van Every was traded back to the Red Sox for a player to be named later.

On May 8, 2010, in a game against the New York Yankees in which Boston would go on to lose 14–3, Van Every pitched for the second time in his career, striking out one batter, and giving up a two-run home run to Mark Teixeira. Also in a game in Baltimore, he hit a solo home run in a game in which the Red Sox would lose.

On May 22, 2010, he was designated for assignment by the Red Sox to make room for the returning Jacoby Ellsbury.

Pittsburg Pirates (second stint) 
On May 31, 2010, the Red Sox traded him to the Pirates for catching prospect Josue Peley. He was assigned to Indianapolis where he hit .214 with 10 home runs in 74 games.

Washington Nationals 
In December 2010, Van Every signed with the Washington Nationals organization. He was released prior to the 2011 season.

St. Paul Saints 
Van Every signed with the St. Paul Saints of the American Association of Independent Professional Baseball and played for them during the 2011 season.

Personal life
Van Every earned his bachelor's degree in business administration from the University of Southern Mississippi in the fall of 2013. He currently resides in Nashville with his fiancée Morgan. As of 2019, he serves as the volunteer Director of Operations for the College of the Holy Cross baseball team in Worcester, MA.

References

External links

1979 births
Living people
Boston Red Sox players
Baseball players from Mississippi
Major League Baseball outfielders
People from Greenwood, Mississippi
Mahoning Valley Scrappers players
Columbus RedStixx players
Lake County Captains players
Kinston Indians players
Akron Aeros players
Buffalo Bisons (minor league) players
Pawtucket Red Sox players
Itawamba Indians baseball players
Indianapolis Indians players
St. Paul Saints players